Darwin Glacier may refer to:

Darwin Glacier (Antarctica), located in Antarctica
Darwin Glacier (Kenya), located on Mount Kenya in Kenya
Darwin Glacier (California), located in the Sierra Nevada of California, USA
Darwin Glacier (Chile), located in Chile, South America
Darwin Glacier (New Zealand), located in Canterbury, New Zealand